Petropavlovsky is a rural locality (a village) in Ufimsky Selsoviet, Khaybullinsky District, Bashkortostan, Russia. The population was 232 as of 2010. There are 4 streets.

Geography 
Petropavlovsky is located 46 km north of Akyar (the district's administrative centre) by road. Verkhnesalimovo is the nearest rural locality.

References 

Rural localities in Khaybullinsky District